Antoine Mérindol (1570-1624) was a French doctor.

Biography
He was born on 20 October 1570 in Aix-en-Provence.

In 1616, he became doctor to Louis XIII of France, who served as King of France from 1610 to 1643. He also taught at Aix-Marseille University. He wrote articles about the medical benefits of taking baths with hot springs from Aix.

He had a son, Jean Mérindol. He died on 26 December 1624.

Legacy
The Rue Mérindol in Aix-en-Provence was named in his honor in 1894, having formerly been named Rue des Baux for Gilles des Baux.

Bibliography
Apologie pour les Bains d'Aix (Aix-en-Provence: Jean Courraud, 1600).

References

1570 births
1624 deaths
People from Aix-en-Provence
17th-century French physicians
Academic staff of Aix-Marseille University